Chrysolina viridana is a species of beetle from a Chrysomelidae family.

Distribution
The species lives in Mediterranean region, in areas like Corsica, Sardinia, Sicily, Southern Italy, Spain, Portugal and North Africa.

References

Beetles described in 1854
Chrysomelinae